The 1994–95 SK Rapid Wien season is the 97th season in club history.

Squad statistics

Fixtures and results

Bundesliga

League table

Cup

References

1994-95 Rapid Wien Season
Austrian football clubs 1994–95 season